Rolf Jacobsen (25 January 1899 – 15 May 1960) was a Norwegian boxer who competed in the 1920 Summer Olympics. He was born in Kristiania. In 1920 he was eliminated in the second round of the middleweight class after losing his fight to Samuel Lagonia.

References

External links
 List of Norwegian boxers

1899 births
1960 deaths
Middleweight boxers
Olympic boxers of Norway
Boxers at the 1920 Summer Olympics
Norwegian male boxers
Sportspeople from Oslo
20th-century Norwegian people